Do Space is a 501(c)(3) non-profit community center for technology, digital library, education, and small makerspace featuring 3D printing technology in Omaha, Nebraska.

History 
Do Space opened in the fall of 2015. Do Space is managed by the non-profit Community Information Trust, which itself is managed by local Omaha philanthropic organization, Heritage Services.

It is located at the southwest corner of 72nd and Dodge Streets in what was a former Borders Books. The building, which was vacant, required retrofitting and modernization of the existing structure. The project, which dates back to 2014, has included $4.1 million for the purchase of the vacant building and $7 million to renovate and fill the space. The design of the building was done by HDR, Inc. Do Space partners with various organizations, including Metropolitan Community College and Omaha Public Library.

Services 
Patrons can use Apple, Windows, and Ubuntu computers that have office, CAD and graphics programs and can access Omaha Public Library databases while at Do Space. Do Space also has tablets and laptops for use, as well a 3D lab that has 3D printers, 3D scanners, and a laser cutter. There are large-format printers as well as break-out rooms with touch screen bulletin boards.

Do Space provides its services free to the public, except for expendables like printing and 3D materials. There are dedicated spaces for small children, teens, as well as adults. There is a group specifically geared towards seniors that incorporates peer-style information-sharing. Metropolitan Community College holds classes on the second floor. Do Space provides a meeting space to nurture an innovation incubator and various community tech groups meet there.

Leadership 
In February 2015, Rebecca Stavick, co-founder of the civic hacking group Open Nebraska and former Omaha Public Library employee, was hired as the Executive Director of Do Space. Michael Sauers, formerly with the Nebraska Library Commission, is the Director of Technology.

References

External links 
 Do Space
 Metropolitan Community College – Continuing Education at Do Space

Libraries in Nebraska
3D printing
Non-profit organizations based in Nebraska
Continuing education
Public libraries in Nebraska